Aldo Elmazi (born 1 February 2000) is an Albanian footballer who plays as a midfielder for Laçi in the Kategoria Superiore.

Career

Laçi
In September 2019, Elmazi made his competitive debut for the club, coming on as a halftime substitute for Flosard Malci in a 0-0 Cup draw with Elbasani. He made his first appearance in the Kategoria Superiore later that season, coming on as a 83rd-minute substitute for Ardit Deliu in a 3–1 home victory over Luftëtari.

Career statistics

Club

References

External links
Aldo Elmazi at Sofa Score

2000 births
Living people
KF Laçi players
Kategoria Superiore players
Albanian footballers
Association football midfielders